Al Rayyan Al Qadeem station is a station on the Doha Metro's Green Line. It serves the municipality of Al Rayyan, specifically Old Al Rayyan, Lebday, and other suburbs of Al Rayyan City. It is found on Al Rayyan Al Qadeem Street in the Lebday district.

The station currently has no metrolinks. Facilities on the premises include restrooms and a prayer room.

History
The station was opened to the public on 10 December 2019 along with the other stations of the Green Line (also known as the Education Line).

Connections
It is served by bus routes 40 and 45.

Station Layout

References

Doha Metro stations
2019 establishments in Qatar
Railway stations opened in 2019